St George Park is a park on the eastern edge of the inner city in Bristol, England, in St George. Built on land that was originally The Fire Engine Farm, the park had many architectural features. All that remains of these is three of the original gate pillars at the main Church Road entrance. Many old photographs of the park show that it was a popular area in Edwardian times. The St George Library is situated on the edge the park, on Church Road.

Facilities
There is a banjo shaped lake fed by a natural stream. It has an island, which serves as the nesting place of swans, ducks and moorhens. Until the mid-1980s, this lake was used for boating, with two separate areas: one for rowing boats and canoes, and the other for small paddle boats, both being available for hire. The lake has since been drained and unsilted, and the boats removed. Now it is used mainly for fishing, and by model boat enthusiasts.

A children's play area, which was modernised in 2009. Two tennis courts and  bowling greens available for hire. There is a skatepark with ramps, jumps, a vert wall and other features. The skatepark is around 20 years old and made of mainly concrete.

At one time there was a band-stand with wrought iron work, but this was not maintained and was eventually demolished. The site, a raised area is still there but now has several rose-beds and benches.
Band concerts are still held in the park during the summer months, but are now generally played near to and not on the actual band-stand site.
The park grounds once offered space to the nearby now-closed St George Grammar School.

References

External links

St George Park, Bristol City Council

Parks and open spaces in Bristol